Hamid Choi Yong Kil is a South Korean translator and professor of Islamic and Arabic studies at Myongji University. Currently serving as chairperson of Korea Muslim Federation (FMK), in 2021 he reportedly became the first Korean Muslim to translate the Quran and Sahih al-Bukhari into Korean language. Choi has also written about ninety articles concerning Islamic studies.

Biography 
Choi has received his degree in Islamic studies from Hankuk University, South Korea and the Islamic University of Madinah. He obtained his PhD from Omdurman Islamic University.

Under the guidance of King Fahd Complex for the Printing of the Holy Quran, he translated Quran into Korean language that took him about seven years.

References 

South Korean translators
Academic staff of Myongji University
Islamic University of Madinah alumni
Omdurman Islamic University alumni
Place of birth missing (living people)
Year of birth missing (living people)
Living people
Hankuk University of Foreign Studies alumni